Litong District (Xiao'erjing: لِ‌طْو ٿِيُوِ) is one of two districts and the seat of the city of Wuzhong in the Ningxia Hui Autonomous Region of the People's Republic of China.

Litong District includes Wuzhong's main urban area, and therefore is usually not marked separately on less-detailed maps, which simply mark the location as "Wuzhong".

Characteristics

Situated on the bank of the Yellow River, Litong District is well known for its agricultural products. Rice paddy products are the most famous. Beginning in 1998, the district's irrigation office and Hohai University teamed up to research the applications of the high-yielding irrigation techniques employed in the district's rice paddies. The district's postal code is 751100.

Administrative units
Since the last administrative reorganization (2007), Litong District has been divided into 4 township-level units, namely eight towns and 4 townships.

In the present, Litong District has 8 towns and 2 townships.

Eight  towns:
 Gucheng Town
 Shangqiao Town
 Shengli Town
 Jinxing Town
 Jinji Town - formerly, Jinjipu 
 Jinyintan Town
 Gaozha Town
 Biandangou Town

Four townships:

 Banqiao Township 
 Malianqu Township
 Dongtasi Township (Just east of downtown Wuzhong): was merged to other.
 Guojiaqiao Township : was merged to other.

There are also special administrative units:
 Balanghu Farm
 Sunjiatan Development Area

References

County-level divisions of Ningxia
Wuzhong, Ningxia